Vine Hill is a historic house in Cross Bridges, Tennessee, USA.

History
The house was built in 1836 for James Henry Webster, the first white man born in Maury County after the county was created. It was designed in the Greek Revival architectural style. He grew cotton and wheat and raised thoroughbreds and mules.

Architectural significance
It has been listed on the National Register of Historic Places since July 15, 1983.

References

Houses on the National Register of Historic Places in Tennessee
Greek Revival houses in Tennessee
Houses completed in 1836
Houses in Maury County, Tennessee
National Register of Historic Places in Maury County, Tennessee